Geiger is a German or French surname. In the German language Geiger means "violin player."

People with this surname
 Abraham Geiger (1810–1874), German reform rabbi
 Arno Geiger (born 1968), Austrian writer
 Dennis Geiger (disambiguation), many people
 Dennis Geiger (born 1998), German footballer
 Dennis Geiger (born 1984), German footballer
 Emily Geiger (born about 1760), legendary heroine of the American Revolutionary War
 Gary Geiger (1937–1996), Major League Baseball player 
 H. Jack Geiger (1925–2020), American physician and civil rights activist
 Hans Geiger (1882–1945), inventor of the Geiger counter and son of Wilhelm Geiger
 Harold Geiger (1884–1927) pioneer in Army aviation and ballooning
 Hermann Geiger (1914–1966), Swiss pilot
 Jacob Casson Geiger (1885–1981), American public health physician
 Johann Nepomuk Geiger (1805–1880), Viennese court painter
 John Geiger (disambiguation)
 Kaylon Geiger (born 1997), American football player
 Ludwig Geiger (1848–1919), German literary historian
 Lazarus Geiger (1829–1870), German philologist and philosopher
 , (1783–1809), German artist
 Mark Geiger (born 1974), American football referee
 Matt Geiger (born 1969), American basketball player
 Michael Geiger (born 1960), German association football player
 Michael Thomas Geiger (born 1957), American vocalist and recording artist
 Nick Geiger, (born 1952) Australian rugby league footballer
 Nikolaus Geiger (1849–1897), German sculptor and painter
 Philipp Lorenz Geiger (1785–1836), German botanist, chemist and pharmacist
 Reinold Geiger (born 1947), Austrian businessman
 Roy Geiger (1885–1947), United States Marine Corps general
 Rudolf Geiger (1894–1981), German meteorologist and climatologist
 Teddy Geiger (born 1988), American singer and guitarist
 Theodor Geiger (1891–1952), German sociologist
 Wilhelm Geiger (1856–1943), German Orientalist and father of Hans Geiger

See also
Guyger

References

French-language surnames
German-language surnames